"Lost in Your Eyes" is a song by American singer-songwriter Debbie Gibson, released as the first single from her second album, Electric Youth (1989). The song was written by Gibson in late 1987 and published by Creative Bloc Music, Ltd. and Deborah Ann's Music in early 1988, with the rights eventually administered by the Music Sales Corporation (ASCAP). A beta arrangement had been performed on the Out of the Blue Tour.

Chart performance
Released on January 6, 1989, "Lost in Your Eyes" debuted at No. 42 on the US Billboard Hot 100 on the week of January 21. On March 4, the ballad climbed to number one and remained there for three weeks, becoming her most successful single and her fifth and last top 10 hit. In Canada, it also reached number one for three weeks, and outside North America, "Lost in Your Eyes" experienced moderate chart success, reaching number seven in Australia and the top 40 in Belgium, Ireland, Spain and the United Kingdom. One variant mixed from the original multitrack, "Lost in Your Eyes" (Piano and Vocal Mix/3:34), was only available in Europe as Track 3 of the CD3 release #A8970CD.

Critical reception
Bryan Buss from AllMusic complimented the song as "a pretty ballad that showcases her songwriting skills, her clear voice, and her talent on the piano." A reviewer from People Magazine stated that Gibson "fares well with torchy ballads" such as "Lost in Your Eyes". Betty Page from Record Mirror wrote, "Golden larynxed Debs hits us with the big moodsome ballad, proving that she's shaping up to be the Barry Manilow of the Nineties. She's obviously trying to shed the popcorn and candyfloss image already, but she's a bit too Minnie Mouse to carry off the sweeping epic just yet. Still, we all had a bit of a weep over the tinkly piano." William Shaw from Smash Hits felt that "she is crooning along to this creaky ballad that some ageing songstress like Elaine Page or Elkie Brooks would feel comfortable with."

Re-recordings
In 2006, Gibson rearranged the song with Tim and Ryan O'Neill for the O'Neill Brothers album Someone You Love. In 2010, Gibson re-recorded the song in both English and Japanese as extra tracks for the Japan-exclusive album Ms. Vocalist. in 2018, Gibson re-recorded the song as "Lost in Your Eyes (Dream Wedding Mix)" for the Hallmark Channel original film Wedding of Dreams.

A duet version with Joey McIntyre is featured in Gibson's 2021 album The Body Remembers. This version was first performed live during New Kids on the Block's Mixtape Tour in 2019.

Track listing

Charts

Weekly charts

Year-end charts

All-time charts

Certifications

Covers
Filipino acoustic band Nyoy Volante & The Mannos covered the song on their 2006 self-titled album.
Filipina singer Sarah Geronimo did a cover of the song for her album Music and Me in 2009.
Japanese singer Nana Mizuki did an acoustic rendition of the song on the January 29, 2017, episode of MTV Unplugged.
Kelly Clarkson covered the song on an episode of The Kelly Clarkson Show in 2021.

References

External links
 
 

1988 songs
1989 singles
1980s ballads
Debbie Gibson songs
Songs written by Debbie Gibson
Atlantic Records singles
Pop ballads
Billboard Hot 100 number-one singles
Cashbox number-one singles
RPM Top Singles number-one singles